Scholes-in-Elmet is a village in Leeds, West Yorkshire, England. Its name is a plural of Old Norse skáli meaning "temporary shed".

It is sometimes known as Scholes-in-Elmet to distinguish it from the villages of the same name in the Holme Valley and Cleckheaton, also by analogy with the neighbouring village of Barwick-in-Elmet and Sherburn in Elmet.

The village is part of the civil parish of Barwick in Elmet and Scholes, sits in the Harewood ward of Leeds City Council and Elmet and Rothwell parliamentary constituency. In 2011, the population of Scholes was 2,266.

History
In the 1800s, Colonel Frederick Trench-Gascoigne (of Parlington Hall, Aberford) owned and rented out a large number of houses, mines, woodlands and farming land in the areas of Scholes, Swarcliffe, Barnbow, Garforth, Barwick-in-Elmet, Cross Gates, and Whinmoor.

In the mid-1880s, a previous occupant of the Seacroft windmill, Isaac Chippindale, started the Scholes Brick and Tile Works on Wood Lane, on the border to Swarcliffe. The company's quarry produced high-quality bricks with which many houses in the surrounding area were built. Its kilns and house were demolished in the early 1980s, leaving two small fishing lakes, but is still known as "Chippy's Quarry".

Amenities

Scholes has two pubs, a dentist and doctors, a hairdressers and beauty salon, a library and two churches. The nearest commercial centres are in Seacroft, the Springs (Barnbow) and Cross Gates. The Seacroft Green shopping centre contains amongst other shops a large Tesco supermarket, while the Cross Gates Shopping Centre (formerly an Arndale Centre) contains many high street shops. Other nearby commercial centres include Garforth and Wetherby.

The Barley Corn is a historic Samuel Smiths pub on Main Street, while the former railway station on Station Road (The Buffers) has been converted into a pub and restaurant.

Transport
Scholes lies close to the Leeds Outer Ring Road, the A64 and the M1. The East Leeds Orbital Road, due for completion in late 2022, will also serve the village. Opened on 1 May 1876, a rail connection owned by LNER (London and North Eastern Railway) ran past the eastern border of Swarcliffe and Stanks, which was a part of the Cross Gates to Wetherby line. In 1965, services were withdrawn as part of the Beeching Axe; an informal name for the British Government's attempt to reduce the cost of running British Railways in the 1960s. Local bus services are 64 and 11, provided by First Leeds.

Comparison
Scholes is in the LS15 postcode area.

Location grid

Climate
The climate in Scholes is moderate.

See also
Listed buildings in Barwick in Elmet and Scholes

Notes

External links

 A site showing places in the UK called Scholes (Scholes-in-Elmet is at the top of the page)
  - Scholes was in this parish

Places in Leeds
Villages in West Yorkshire